Banco Itau Paraguay S.A. was founded in 1978 as Interbanco SA. property of National Bank of Brazil. In 1995 was acquired by Unibanco Group. As a result of the merger between Unibanco and Banco Itaú in 2008, was renamed Banco Itaú Paraguay S.A in 2010. Itau is considered the biggest bank in Paraguay. Jose Britez Infante assumed as CEO in late 2020 replacing Brazilian Andre Gailey, it is the first time a Paraguayan holds this position.

External links
 Official Website

References 

Itaúsa
Itaú Unibanco
Banks of Paraguay
Banks established in 1978
Paraguayan brands